Aleppo is an unincorporated community in Aleppo Township, Greene County, in the U.S. state of Pennsylvania.

History
A post office called Aleppo has been in operation since 1869. The community was named after the Syrian city of Aleppo.

References

Unincorporated communities in Greene County, Pennsylvania
Unincorporated communities in Pennsylvania